Jordanhill is an affluent area of the West End of the city of Glasgow, Scotland. The area consists largely of terraced housing dating from the early to mid 20th century, with some detached and semi-detached homes and some modern apartments.

The University of Strathclyde formerly had an education faculty in the area and the associated school has a high reputation.

History
The area was previously part of the Jordanhill Estate within the parish of Renfrew centred on Jordanhill House. Before the twentieth century, Jordanhill was a poor area, similar to neighbouring Knightswood, with mining for coal at Skaterigg. The building of more affluent residences was coincidental with the expansion of Glasgow and the construction of a commuter railway (similar to Bearsden in the 1870s).

The site of the house was sold to Jordanhill Teacher Training College, and is now the home of the Strathclyde University Faculty Of Education. The area consists largely of terraced housing dating from the early to mid 20th century, with some detached and semi-detached homes and some modern apartments.

Jordanhill, Temple and Knightswood have been linked to stories of the Knights Templar; but there is no evidence for their presence in this area. When asked, the Lord Lyon King of Arms rebutted a proposal to include the Maltese cross of the Knights of St. John in the crest of Jordanhill College. Jordanhill may be related to the family name "Jardine".

Amenities
There are a number of parks in Jordanhill and the immediate vicinity, as well as large playing fields on the Jordanhill Campus. Jordanhill is directly adjacent to Victoria Park, one of the largest green spaces in Glasgow and home to the Fossil Grove, an area of fossilized prehistoric tree stumps.

The area has excellent transport links. Jordanhill railway station has regular local train services to central Glasgow on the North Clyde and Argyle lines, and regular bus services are provided by First Glasgow. The Clyde Tunnel is located nearby, giving road access to the south of the city.

There are two pubs in the area, both are situated on Crow Road, near the railway station.

This area used to be home to a branch of The Jolly Giant Toy Superstores, based on Crow Road.

Education

Jordanhill School is located on Chamberlain Road at the foot of the hill on which Jordanhill College sits, and was formerly the College's training school. It is now a state comprehensive school. The school is unique in the Scottish state sector in that it contains both Primary and Secondary departments, providing education for children from 4 to 18, and in that it has Grant Maintained status and is independent from local government control. It had previously been an independent demonstration school for Jordanhill College. Private school the High School of Glasgow is also located in the Jordanhill vicinity.

Saint Thomas Aquinas Secondary School is a Catholic secondary school located on Mitre Road in the newer part of Jordanhill. It has several feeder primary schools, including Corpus Christi (Knightswood), Notre Dame (Dowanhill), St Pauls (Whiteinch), St. Peter's (Partick), St. Brendan's (Yoker), St. Patrick's in (Anderston), St. Clare's (Drumchapel) and St. Ninian's (Blairdardie).

Places of worship
There are two churches in Jordanhill, both located on Woodend Drive, off Crow Road: Jordanhill Parish Church (Church of Scotland) and All Saints Church (Episcopalian). Both churches are used for a variety of community and social events, in addition to regular worship, and All Saints is also home to Westbourne Gardens Nursery School. The 72nd and 178th Glasgow Scouts are based in the area, as well as 130th and the 272nd Glasgow Boys' Brigades.

See also
Hillhead Jordanhill RFC

References

External links
Jordanhill School
A Short History of Jordanhill dated 1931
Historical notes on South Jordanhill
130th Glasgow Company, The Boys' Brigade
Jordanhill Parish Church (Church of Scotland)
All Saints Scottish Episcopal Church

Jordanhill Phoenix Rugby Football Club

 
Areas of Glasgow